Atsimo-Andrefana is a region of Madagascar. It borders Menabe in north, Amoron'i Mania and Haute Matsiatra in northeast, Ihorombe and Anosy in east and Androy in southeast. The capital is Toliara and the population was 1,799,088 in 2018.

Administrative divisions
Atsimo-Andrefana Region is divided into nine districts, which are sub-divided into 105 communes.

 Ampanihy District - 16 communes
 Ankazoabo District - 5 communes
 Benenitra District - 5 communes
 Betioky Sud District - 5 communes
 Beroroha District - 19 communes
 Morombe District - 8 communes
 Sakaraha District - 11 communes
 Toliary I District - 1 commune
 Toliara II District - 19 communes

Transport

Airports
Ampanihy Airport
Andavadoaka Airport
Ankazoabo Airport
Beroroha Airport
Betioky Airport
Morombe Airport
Tanandava Airport
Toliara Airport

Protected areas
In Atsimo-Andrefana are found the following protected areas:
Part of Mangoky Ihotry Wetland Complex
Velondriake New Protected Area
Tsinjoriake New Protected Area
Analandraza Analavelo New Protected Area
Ranobe Bay New Protected Area
Ranobe PK32 New Protected Area
Atsimo Andrefan'Ifotaky New Protected Area
Vohidefo New Protected Area
 Beza Mahafaly Reserve
Mikea National Park
Nosy Ve-Androka National Park
 Zombitse-Vohibasia National Park
 Tsimanampetsotsa National Park
Reniala Reserve
Soariake New Protected Area
Amoron'i Onilahy New Protected Area

Rivers
Mayor river in Atsimo-Andrefana is the Onilahy River and in the north the Mangoky River.
Also the Fiherenana River and Linta River flows in that region while the Menarandra River forms the border with region of Androy in the south.

Economy

Mining
Basibasy mine

References

EDBM

 
Regions of Madagascar